Emma Maria Macfarren (née Emma Marie Bennett) (19 June 1824 – 9 November 1895) was an English pianist and composer who used the pseudonym Jules Brissac.

She was born in London, and in 1846 married John Macfarren, brother of composer George Alexander Macfarren. She toured in the United States of America between 1862 and 1873 with her "Mornings at the Piano" lecture series and published a number of original songs and transcriptions. She died in London.

Works
Macfarren was known for popular piano works. Selected works for piano under the pseudonym Jules Brissac include:

Cerisette (1854), morceau de salon
Léonie (1854), nocturne
Paulina, Op. 19 (1855), nocturne
Corinne, Op. 22 (1855), nocturne
La vie et le rêve (1855), nocturne
Olenka (1855), mazurka de salon
Un moment de repos, Op. 30 (1856), nocturne
Le passé et le présent, Op. 26 (1857)
Couleur de rose, Op. 21 (1861), bluette
Long ago, Op. 10 (1863), nocturne
The Butterfly, Op. 97 (1863), caprice-étude
The Village Bell, Op. 98 (1863), pastoral melody
The Music of the Sea, Op. 104 (1863), caprice-nocturne
The Babbling Brook, Le murmure du ruisseau (1865), caprice-étude
Trois récréations (1865), polkas
Valse de Bravoure (1870)

References

1824 births
1895 deaths
19th-century classical composers
British music educators
Women classical composers
English classical composers
Musicians from London
19th-century English musicians
19th-century British composers
Women music educators
19th-century women composers